Adrian Spyrka (born 1 August 1967) is a German former professional footballer who played as a midfielder.

References

External links
 
 

1967 births
Living people
German people of Polish descent
Polish emigrants to West Germany
Naturalized citizens of Germany
Sportspeople from Zabrze
Association football midfielders
German footballers
Germany under-21 international footballers
Borussia Dortmund players
Borussia Dortmund II players
1. FC Saarbrücken players
Stuttgarter Kickers players
1. FC Köln players
Rot-Weiss Essen players
SG Wattenscheid 09 players
1. FSV Mainz 05 players
Bundesliga players
2. Bundesliga players
West German footballers